Terrone (plural , feminine ) is an Italian term to designate, in an often pejorative manner, people who dwell in Southern Italy or are of Southern Italian descent.

History
The term comes from an agent noun formed from the word  (Italian for "land"). In fact it was historically used, after the Italian unification, to describe the landlords of the former Kingdom of the Two Sicilies, highlighting the fact that they profited from a type of land property, the latifundium, by which they used to own the land without ever working it; the word also stands for "person from a land [such as Southern Italy] prone to earthquakes".

Until the 1950s, terrone kept the classist meaning of "peasant", that is "person working the land (hence the word terra)"; at one point, even people migrating from the relatively more rural regions of Veneto, Emilia-Romagna and Tuscany to the industrialised Lombardy had been accordingly nicknamed terroni del nord ("Northern Terroni"). However, it was not until the Italian economic miracle, when a great number of Southerners migrated to the industrial centers of Northern Italy, that it began to be strictly used (often as a slur) to indicate people from Southern Italy. From terrone later derived Terronia "the land of the Terroni", and the adjective terronico "anything related to the Terroni".

The epithet often implies certain negative stereotypes for the person being labelled, such as laziness, ignorance and lack of hygiene.

In Italy, the term has strong xenophobic undertones of rejection and has been recognized as a discriminatory insult by the Italian Court of Cassation.

See also
 Racism in Italy
 Italy's North-South economic divide

Notes

References

Bibliography

Pejorative terms for European people
Society of Italy
Italian culture